Mohamed Abdullah (born 1935) is an Iraqi pole vaulter. He competed in the 1960 Summer Olympics.

References

External links
 

1935 births
Living people
Athletes (track and field) at the 1960 Summer Olympics
Iraqi male athletes
Olympic athletes of Iraq
Sportspeople from Baghdad